Lauren B. Davis (née Cargill) is a Canadian writer. She is best known for her novels Our Daily Bread, which was named one of the best books of 2011 by The Globe and Mail and The Boston Globe.  and The Empty Room, a semi-autobiographical novel about alcoholism. She currently lives in Princeton, New Jersey with her husband, Zurich Financial executive, Ron Davis, and their dog, Bailey (The Rescuepoo)

Biography
Born in Montreal, Quebec, on September 5, 1955, Davis lived in France for over a decade (1994-2004), and now resides in Princeton, New Jersey.

Early in her career, Davis was mentored by Timothy Findley, at the Humber College School for Writers, where she went on to be a mentor (2007-2009). She was past European editor for the Literary Review of Canada from 1999 to 2002.

Davis has been a mentor with the Humber College School for Writers and Guelph University's MFA program. She taught fiction writing at the WICE (Paris); the American University of Paris; the Geneva Writers' Conference; and Seattle University's Writers' Conference in Allihies, Ireland.  Davis has also lectured on writing at Trent University, Rider University, Humber College and The Paris Writers' Workshop. Davis ran a community writing program in Princeton called Sharpening the Quill from 2006-2018.

Publications
"Even So" was published in 2022 and named one of the "Best Books of the Year" by the Quill & Quire. Her novel The Grimoire of Kensington Market was named one of the "Best Books of 2018" by The Globe and Mail and was short-listed for the Canadian Authors Association Fred Kerner Award . Our Daily Bread was long-listed for the Scotiabank Giller Prize, and named as one of the "Very Best Books of 2011" by The Globe and Mail, and "Best of 2011" by The Boston Globe; The Empty Room (2007) was named one of the best books of the year by the Toronto Star, The Globe & Mail, and the Winnipeg Free Press; The Radiant City (2005) was a finalist for the Rogers Writers' Trust Fiction Prize. The Stubborn Season (2002), was chosen for the Robert Adams Lecture Series and named one of the best-selling books of the year by Amazon.ca.  Adams's lecture was televised on TVOntario's program Imprint. An Unrehearsed Desire  (2008) was longlisted for the ReLit Awards. Her short fiction has also been shortlisted for the CBC Literary Awards and she is the recipient of two Mid-Career Writer Sustaining grants from the Canada Council for the Arts, in 2000 and 2006.

Bibliography
Rat Medicine and Other Unlikely Curatives. Oakville, ON: Mosaic, 2000.
The Stubborn Season. Toronto: HarperCollins Canada, 2002.
The Radiant City. Toronto: HarperCollins Canada, 2005. (Short-listed for the Roger's Writers' Trust Fiction Prize)
An Unrehearsed Desire. Toronto: Exile Editions Canada, 2008. (Long-listed for the Re-Lit Prize)
Our Daily Bread. Wordcraft of Oregon, 2011. HarperCollins Canada 2012 (Long-listed for the Scotiabank Giller Prize)
The Empty Room. HarperCollins Canada, 2013 (named as one of the Best Books of the Year by the National Post and The Winnipeg Free Press)
Against A Darkening Sky. HarperAvenue Canada, 2015 and Chizine Publications (US), 2015
The Grimoire of Kensington Market. Wolsak and Wynn/Buckrider Book (Canada & US), 2018
Even So. Dundurn Press (Canada & US), 2022

References

External links
Official Site of Lauren B. Davis

Canadian women novelists
Living people
Writers from Montreal
1955 births
21st-century Canadian novelists
21st-century Canadian women writers